Jean-Baptiste Forceville (Saint-Omer, 1655 – Brussels, 1739) is one of the striking organ builders from the early 18th century. He is sometimes called the "father of the Flemish Rococo organ". His style broke with the traditional structures of the organ and he formed a school that dominated the entire 18th century in the Low Countries.

Forceville studied with his fellow townsman the organ maker Francois van Isacker (1633-1682). He later settled in Antwerp after practicing his profession as a traveling organ builder. From then on his activities were limited to a few places of worship in Antwerp and surroundings. He also became a member of the Guild of Saint Luke, the association of Antwerp traders and antique dealers, and married there. Around 1705, Forceville moved to Brussels where he was appointed organ master at the Court and was charged with the construction of a monumental organ in the Cathedral of St. Michael and St. Gudula. Other work of him included the organ in the church of Ninove Abbey. His son Thomas was also an organ builder.

References
 J. Robijns & Miep Zijlstra, Algemene Muziek Encyclopedie deel 3, Unieboek 1980, pagina 252/253 met tekst uit De orgelmakers Forceville van G.Potvlieghe, 1962; 
 G. Potvlieghe, Joannes-Baptista Forceville (1655-1739) - vader van het Vlaamse rococo-orgel, in Orgelkunst, nr. 157, jg. 40, juni 2017, p. 80-97
 G. Potvlieghe, De orgelmakers Forceville, in De Brabantse Folklore, 1962, nr. 152, pp. 318–361
 G. Potvlieghe, Hoge barok met J.B. Forceville, in: F. Peeters & M.A. Vente, De orgelkunst in de Nederlanden van de 16de tot de 18de eeuw, Gaade/Amerongen, 1984, pp. 218–222
 A. Fauconnier, J.B. Forceville, vader van het Vlaamse Rococo-orgel, in Vlaanderen, nr. 129, jg. 21, november-december 1972, pp. 330–332

1655 births
1739 deaths
French pipe organ builders